The Centro Fotográfico Manuel Álvarez Bravo is a photographic exhibition centre in the city of Oaxaca, Mexico.

The centre is named after the Mexican photographer Manuel Álvarez Bravo (1902–2002). It is located in the Graphic Arts Institute of Oaxaca.

See also
 List of museums devoted to one photographer

References

External links 

  

Photography museums and galleries in Mexico
Alvarez Bravo
Museums in Oaxaca